Korendijk was a municipality in the western Netherlands, in the province of South Holland.

With the municipal reorganization of the Hoeksche Waard on 1 January 1984, the municipality of Korendijk was formed out of the former municipalities of Goudswaard, Nieuw-Beijerland, Piershil (location of town hall), Zuid-Beijerland, and the island Tiengemeten. In addition to these villages, it also had the population centres Nieuwendijk and Zuidzijde. On 1 January 2019, it merged into the municipality of Hoeksche Waard.

The municipality of Korendijk was bordered on the southside by the Haringvliet estuary, on the westside by the Spui River, and by the municipalities Oud-Beijerland and Cromstrijen to the north and east.

Topography

Dutch Topographic map of the municipality of Korendijk, June 2015

See also

References

External links
Official website

Hoeksche Waard
Former municipalities of South Holland
Municipalities of the Netherlands disestablished in 2019